Sabzabad (also Romanized as Sabzābād) is a village in Khosrow Beyk Rural District, Milajerd District, Komijan County, Markazi Province, Iran. At the 2006 census, its population was 84, in 19 families.

References 

Populated places in Komijan County